This is a list of international para table tennis tournaments. The list also contains the most recent winners to have won titles in each event.

Current events
As of 2019. Bold events are new para table tennis events.

Defunct events
These events feature the last winners of each tournament.

References

Table tennis competitions
Para table tennis